Atarsamain (also spelled Attar-shamayin, Attarshamayin, Attarsame (ʿAttarsamē); "morning star of heaven") was an astral deity of uncertain gender, worshipped in the pre-Islamic northern and central Arabian Peninsula. Worshipped widely by Arab tribes, Atarsamain is known from around 800 BC and is identified in letters of the Assyrian kings Esarhaddon and Assurbanipal. Atarsamain may be identical with Allāt, whose cult was centred on Palmyra and also with Attar.

According to Dierk Lange, Atarsamain was the main deity in a trinity of gods worshipped by what he calls the Yumu'il Confederation, which he describes as a northern Arab tribal confederation of Ishmaelite ancestry headed by the "clan of Kedar" (i.e. the Qedarites). Lange identifies Nuha as the solar deity, Ruda as the lunar deity, and Atarsamin as the main deity associated with Venus. A similar trinity of gods representing the sun, moon and Venus is found among the peoples of the South Arabian kingdoms of Awsan, Ma'in, Qataban and Hadhramawt between the 9th and 4th centuries BC. There, the deity associated with Venus was Astarte, the sun deity was Yam, and moon deity was variously called Wadd, Amm and Sin.

Atarsamain is twice mentioned in the annals of Ashurbanipal, king of the Neo-Assyrian empire in the 7th century BC. The reference is to a?lu (sā) a-tar-sa-ma-a-a-in ("the people of Attar of Heaven") who are said to have been defeated together with the Nebayot (Nebaioth/Nabataeans) and the Qedarites led by Yauta ben Birdadda, who was also known as "king of the Arabs".

References

Bibliography

Further reading
Encyclopedia of Gods, Michael Jordan, Kyle Cathie Limited, 2002

Arabian deities
Arab history
Stellar deities
Venusian deities